The Harvard Crimson represented Harvard University in ECAC women's ice hockey. The Crimison will attempt to win the NCAA tournament for the first time in school history.

Offseason

Recruiting

Regular season

Standings

Schedule

Conference record

Roster

Awards and honors
Jillian Dempsey, ECAC Player of the Week (Week of January 7, 2013)

References

Harvard Crimson women's ice hockey seasons
2012–13 NCAA Division I women's hockey season
Harvard Crimson
Harvard Crimson women's ice hockey
Harvard Crimson women's ice hockey
Harvard Crimson women's ice hockey
Harvard Crimson women's ice hockey